The following is a list of episodes from the long-running series Space Racers.

Series overview

Episodes

Space Race webisodes (2011)

Season 1 (2014)
The first season consists of 26 half-hour episodes, which debuted on May 2, 2014, on PBS Kids.
 Eagle, Hawk, and Robyn are present in all episodes.
 Raven was absent for 32 episodes.
 Starling was absent for 26 episodes.

Season 2 (2016–18)
The second season consists of 20 half-hour episodes, which debuted on October 31, 2016, on Universal Kids. This was the first season not to run on PBS Kids. The last 12 episodes of this season were accidentally listed as "Season 3" on TV guides.
 Eagle and Hawk were absent for 2 episodes.
 Robyn was absent for 3 episodes.
 Raven was absent for 21 episodes.
 Starling was absent for 22 episodes.

References

Space Racers